Longham is a village situated in the Breckland District of Norfolk and covers an area of 540 hectares (2.1 square miles) with a population of 219 in 100 households at the 2001 census, increasing to a population of 224 in 99 households at the 2011 Census.

The villages name means 'homestead/village of Lawa's people'.

Longham is served by the mediaeval church of St. Andrew & St. Peter in the  Benefice of Gressenhall. It is a grade II* listed building.

Robert Howlett
The Victorian photographer Robert Howlett grew up in the parsonage at Longham from circa 1840 until 1852, the second of four sons of Reverend Robert Howlett and Harriet Harsant. He is renowned for his iconic photograph of Isambard Kingdom Brunel. Circa 1845, the parsonage in Longham had an electrical telegraph link to the local Manor House only eight years after Samuel Morse filed his telegraphy patent in America.

References

http://kepn.nottingham.ac.uk/map/place/Norfolk/Longham

Villages in Norfolk
Civil parishes in Norfolk
Breckland District